Brian Tesler   (born 19 February 1929) is a British television producer and executive. His career encompassed British television's post-war evolution from a single-channel BBC to the beginning of today’s multitude of cable and satellite channels. He worked as a producer for Independent Television, as well as the BBC.

Tesler joined BBC Television as a trainee Light Entertainment producer in 1952 and was put in charge of the Department's output of panel games, both finding and producing them, which he proceeded to do by introducing Guess My Story, Find the Link, The Tall Story Club and The Name's the Same. He devised the Billy Cotton Band Show, inventing Billy Cotton's "Wakey! Wakey!" catchphrase, and worked with The Television Toppers who were the dancers on the early series of the show. He devised British Television's first request show Ask Pickles with Wilfred Pickles. He worked with stage and screen  stars such as Gracie Fields, Julie Andrews, Tony Bennett, Bob Hope and Mario Lanza. As a technician, he worked with The Leslie Roberts Dancers which became The Leslie Roberts Silhouettes after technology on which he had been working.

With fellow ex-trainee Ernest Maxin he co-produced and directed the first television comedy series by Frank Muir and Denis Norden, And So to Bentley, starring Dick Bentley, Peter Sellers and Bill Fraser. He produced series with Bob Monkhouse, Petula Clark, and Bathnight with Braden, starring Bernard Braden and written by Muir and Norden, which was BBC Television's first weekly comedy series, such shows until then only being broadcast fortnightly.

At ATV from 1957 to 1960, Tesler took over Sunday Night at the London Palladium, with Bruce Forsyth as host. He produced specials built round such international artistes as Rosemary Clooney and Johnnie Ray, devised and produced series of Val Parnell's Saturday Spectaculars with Max Bygraves, Dickie Henderson, Arthur Askey, Harry Secombe and Dave King, and devised and produced New Look, a revue with a team of new performers including Roy Castle, whose television career the series began. In 1957, he received BAFTA's first award for Light Entertainment Production when the Academy was still the Society of Film and Television Arts. His last production was Sammy Davis Jr's first show for British TV in 1960.
 
As Director of Programmes at ABC-TV and Thames Television during the 1960s and 1970s, he oversaw the first British television shows of Frank Sinatra, Jack Benny, Peggy Lee and Bing Crosby. He introduced ITV's first weekly series dedicated to the arts with Tempo; British television's first late night chat show with Eamonn Andrews Live from London and its first hidden camera show Candid Camera (based on the American original) with Bob Monkhouse. Programmes he commissioned included Thank Your Lucky Stars, Callan, The Benny Hill Show, Public Eye and The World at War.
 
Tesler was a founder-director of both Thames Television and Channel 4; managing director and then chairman and managing director of London Weekend Television; and the founder-chairman of ITV's first venture into satellite broadcasting with SuperChannel. During his career, he worked for four superiors: Ronnie Waldman, Lew Grade, Howard Thomas and John Freeman; and when he became a broadcasting boss himself he appointed four future significant figures: Jeremy Isaacs as his Controller of Features at Thames; Michael Grade, John Birt and Greg Dyke successively as his Directors of Programmes at LWT.

Tesler retired in 1994, and has written two books about his life and career. The first, Before I Forget, published in 2006, described his family life, growing up in London's East End Jewish community before and during the Second World War. The second, The Best Of Times, published in 2016, is an in-depth account of his professional career as a producer of light entertainment in the 1950s and 1960s and then as a senior executive in independent television from the 1970s until 1994.

In December 2019 he was presented by Lord Michael Grade with the Television and Radio Industries Club's Special Award for his contribution to British television.

Bibliography
 Before I Forget: A Personal Memoir 
 The Best Of Times: A Personal History of British Television 1952-1994

References

 https://web.archive.org/web/20150415181640/http://www.tric.org.uk/membership/brian_tesler.html
 http://www.somethingjewish.co.uk/articles/2496_brian_tesler_intervi.htm
 http://www.78rpm.co.uk/atv.htm#bb7
 https://www.bbc.co.uk/news/entertainment-arts-30333533
 https://web.archive.org/web/20150415180311/http://www.televisionheaven.co.uk/billy_cotton.htm
 Turned Out Nice Again: The Story Of British Light Entertainment 
 The Making of Channel Four 
 Armchair Theatre: The Lost Years 
 The World At War

External links
 

1929 births
Living people
BBC television producers
Channel 4 people
Commanders of the Order of the British Empire
English Jews
Place of birth missing (living people)